Ascalenia kairaella is a moth in the family Cosmopterigidae. It is found in the United Arab Emirates, Iran and India.

The wingspan is 5.5–8 mm.

References

Moths described in 1969
Ascalenia
Moths of Asia